The 2015 USASA National Women's Open was the 20th staging of the tournament, and the third under a new format that eliminates regional qualification.  The finals included four teams and took place from July 16 to 19.

The defending champions were the NY Athletic Club who became the second-winningest team in the competition and winningest still-active team.

The four teams participating were the ASA Chesapeake Charge, Fredericksburg FC, NY Athletic Club, and Olympic Club, competing in a round-robin.  Due to inclement weather, the planned final was not played, and group stage winners Olympic Club were crowned champions after upsetting the ASA Chesapeake Charge on the final day of group play.

Olympic Club's victory follows their victory in the amateur cup last season.  The Charge were left in second place for the second year in a row.

Group play

Schedule
First two matchdays not recorded

Standings

References

2015
Open
United